The Federal Detention Center, Miami (FDC Miami) is a prison operated by the Federal Bureau of Prisons. It is located in downtown Miami, at the corner of Northeast Fourth Street and North Miami Avenue. The administrative facility employed 311 staff as of 2002 and housed 1,512 male and female inmates as of July 15, 2010.

Background
Built in 1995, the detention center was designed for a capacity of 1,259 inmates. The facility primarily houses prisoners of the U.S. Marshals Service, both male and female. Its mission is to provide a safe and humane confinement of inmates and detainees, many of whom are involved in federal court proceedings in the Southern District of Florida.

Security procedures
Inmates are screened by a unit team member, and assigned quarters based on personal profile and security needs. Each unit team is composed of a unit manager, case manager(s), correctional counselor(s), and at times, an education representative. A federal register number is assigned to each inmate for identification and forwarding of correspondence while in federal custody.

In June 2010, the facility's security procedures prevented attorney Brittney Horstman from meeting a client when her underwire bra set off a metal detector. After returning from a bathroom without the item, she was turned away because of the detention center's dress code. The federal public defender's office contacted Warden Linda McGrew, who conducted an inquiry. McGrew concluded the incident was "an aberration" and promised it would not happen again.

Sexual victimization
According to a 2005 U.S. Justice Department report, an estimated 12 percent of the complaints received by the department's inspector general involved inmates claiming sexual victimization by prison staff. In 2009, federal judge Cecilia Altonaga wrote that although the statute of limitations had passed to award damages in a civil case, "the BOP and FDC Miami did have notice of the illegal conduct taking place, and were woefully deficient in addressing it."

Notable inmates (current and former)
†Inmates in the Federal Witness Protection Program are not listed on the Bureau of Prisons website.

See also

List of U.S. federal prisons
Federal Bureau of Prisons
Incarceration in the United States

References

External links
Federal Detention Center, Miami

Prisons in Florida
Miami
Buildings and structures in Miami
1995 establishments in Florida